Laurentides-Labelle was a provincial electoral district in the Laurentides region of  Quebec that elected members to the National Assembly of Quebec. It was created for the 1973 Quebec general election, from parts of the Labelle electoral district. Its final election was in 1976, before it was replaced by the recreated Labelle.

Members of the National Assembly
Roger Lapointe, Liberal (1973–1976)
Jacques Léonard, Parti Québécois (1976–1981)

External links
Election results
 Election results (National Assembly)
 Election results (QuebecPolitique.com)

Former provincial electoral districts of Quebec